Keyvan Vahdani ( 1 April 1991 – 20 March 2019) was an Iranian footballer. He played for Paykan, Nassaji and Pars Jonoubi.

He died in a landslide in Mazandaran Province, Iran, on 20 March 2019 at the age of 27.

References

1991 births
2019 deaths
Iranian footballers
Paykan F.C. players
Nassaji Mazandaran players
Saba players
Aluminium Arak players
Deaths in landslides
Association football forwards